Howard Wayne Redmond (November 25, 1945 – August 8, 2020) was an American former professional baseball player. In nine MLB games played as an outfielder, pinch hitter and pinch runner, Redmond drew one base on balls in eight plate appearances with no hits. He scored one run.

He was signed by the Tigers after graduating from Detroit's Central High School and hit 31 home runs in his first minor league season, split between Detroit farm clubs at the Class A and Double-A levels. That led to his first late-season trial in 1965. Redmond started one game during his MLB career, in centerfield on October 3, and went hitless in four at bats against Joe Coleman of the Washington Senators. Apart from his September 1969 callup to the Tigers, in which he played in five games as a pinch hitter and pinch runner, Redmond spent the remainder of his career in the minors.

After his career in baseball, Redmond became an Elder in The Church of Our Lord Jesus Christ of the Apostolic Faith (COOLJC). Elder Wayne Redmond died on August 8, 2020; he is interred at Detroit's Grand Lawn Cemetery.

References

External links

1945 births
2020 deaths
African-American baseball players
Baseball players from Alabama
Baseball players from Detroit
Detroit Tigers players
Hawaii Islanders players
Jamestown Tigers players
Major League Baseball outfielders
Montgomery Rebels players
People from Athens, Alabama
Rocky Mount Leafs players
Shreveport Braves players
Toledo Mud Hens players
Tucson Toros players